Åsa Solberg Iversen (born 7 April 1929 in Overhalla, Nord-Trøndelag, died 3 February 2009 in Fredrikstad) was a Norwegian politician (Ap). She was elected to the Stortinget from Østfold in 1985. She was deputy representative from 1973–1977, 1977–1981 and 1981–1985.

Roles 
 1 January 1973 – 1 January 1976: personal secretary Social Department

Storting committees 
1989–1993: member of Standing Committee on Business and Industry
1985–1989: member of Control Committee
1985–1989: member of Standing Committee on Defence
1981–1985: member of Standing Committee on Justice

External links 
Stortinget.no: Representant: Iversen, Åsa Solberg
Østfold Arbeiderparti: Åsa Solberg Iversen til minne

Members of the Storting
People from Overhalla
1929 births
2009 deaths
Labour Party (Norway) politicians
20th-century Norwegian politicians